Guillaume Lefebvre (born May 7, 1981) is a former Canadian professional ice hockey left winger who played four seasons in the National Hockey League (NHL) for the Philadelphia Flyers, Pittsburgh Penguins, and Boston Bruins.

Playing career
Lefebvre was drafted in the seventh round, 227th overall, of the 2000 NHL Entry Draft by the Philadelphia Flyers. After spending three seasons in the Quebec Major Junior Hockey League (QMJHL), Lefebvre made his professional debut with the Philadelphia Phantoms of the American Hockey League (AHL) during the 2001 AHL Playoffs.

Lefebvre captured the Phantoms' Rookie of the Year Award after tallying 19 goals and adding 15 assists for 34 points in 2002.

During the 2002-03 season Lefebvre was traded from the Philadelphia Phantoms/Philadelphia Flyers to the Phoenix Coyotes, but was then traded to the Pittsburgh Penguins before playing a game as a Coyote. His first NHL goal came as a member of the Penguins.

On September 12, 2009 Lefebvre was invited to the Boston Bruins' NHL training camp, and on September 26, his work in the pre-season was rewarded with a one-year contract to play with the Bruins.

Awards and honours
Philadelphia Phantoms' Rookie of the Year (2002)

Career statistics

References

External links
 

1981 births
Bakersfield Condors (1998–2015) players
Boston Bruins players
Canadian expatriate ice hockey players in Austria
Canadian ice hockey left wingers
Cape Breton Screaming Eagles players
Graz 99ers players
Ice hockey people from Quebec
Living people
People from Amos, Quebec
Philadelphia Flyers draft picks
Philadelphia Flyers players
Philadelphia Phantoms players
Pittsburgh Penguins players
Providence Bruins players
Quebec Remparts players
Rouyn-Noranda Huskies players
Shawinigan Cataractes players
Springfield Falcons players
Wilkes-Barre/Scranton Penguins players